Robert Karl Oermann is a Nashville-based music journalist and author who is recognized as an authority on country music. Oermann is a long-time regular contributor to the trade publication MusicRow, for which he writes a weekly column.

Biography
Oermann was born in Pittsburgh, Pennsylvania, grew up there, and attended the University of Pittsburgh, receiving an undergraduate degree in fine arts. As a boy, he started a record collection with the records that he was given as compensation when he helped out in his grandmother's Pittsburgh record store. That childhood collection grew to become what was described in 1999 as "one of the largest private record archives" in Nashville.

He began his professional career working as an artist and illustrator. In the 1970s he worked as advertising manager for a chain of record stores in St. Louis. After receiving a master's degree from Syracuse University in the field of information studies, in 1978 he moved to Nashville for a job with the Country Music Foundation (CMF), where he was in charge of technical services for the organization and its Country Music Hall of Fame and Museum.

While working at the CMF, Oermann began doing freelance writing on music and developed a reputation as a music historian. As a freelance contributor, he wrote thousands of articles for national publications such as Entertainment Weekly, Esquire, Billboard, The Hollywood Reporter, Musician, Us, TV Guide, and Country Song Roundup. In 1982 he became the first country music reporter and critic for USA Today, continuing in that position until 1986. Also in 1982, he became music reporter for Nashville's daily newspaper, The Tennessean, a position he held until 1993. He was editor-at-large for Country Music magazine, which ceased publication in 2003. He is credited for the liner notes for at least 75 albums, including the recording of the O Brother, Where Art Thou? movie soundtrack.

He has written and co-authored several books on country music and its history. With his wife, Mary Agnes Bufwack, an anthropologist and social worker, he co-wrote Finding Her Voice: The Saga of Women in Country Music, which was awarded the ASCAP Deems Taylor Award for music-book excellence.

Oermann also has worked in film, television, and radio, primarily as a writer for documentaries and sometimes also as a host. He was a judge on the USA Network reality TV show Nashville Star for the series' first season, which aired in 2003.

Works

Books

Film and video
Music Row Video (UPI, 1983–1984), nationally syndicated television series on country music, written and co-hosted by Oermann
The Women of Country (CBS, 1993), television series written by Oermann
America's Music: The Roots of Country (TBS, 1996), documentary film series directed by Tom Neff and Jerry Aronson, written by Neff and Robert K. Oermann
The Black Experience in Country Music (1998), documentary written and directed by Oermann
SoundTable (1999), documentary written and directed by Oermann
Century of Country (TNN, 1999), Oermann was historical consultant

Radio
The Conway Twitty Story (1980), syndicated radio program, scripted by Oermann
Album Country (1988), syndicated radio program, scripted by Oermann
Music City's New Country (1991–1994), radio show written and hosted by Oermann for WSM-FM in Nashville, also syndicated in Japan

References

External links
 Robert K. Oermann archive at MusicRow website
 Robert K. "Bob" Oermann Oral History Interview, November 20, 1987, Country Music Hall of Fame

American music journalists
Living people
Writers from Pittsburgh
Syracuse University alumni
University of Pittsburgh alumni
USA Today journalists
Journalists from Pennsylvania
Year of birth missing (living people)
Judges in American reality television series